Torre Axa México, previously Mexicana de Aviación Tower (Spanish: Torre Mexicana de Aviación), is a landmark located in Colonia del Valle in Benito Juárez, Mexico City, Mexico. It was designed by Rafael Mijares and Andrés Giovanni.

In 2003, the airline announced plans to sell the tower, considered to be a landmark in the city, for US$35 million as an initial offer. Fibramex became the new owner of the tower; CB Richard Ellis, an American firm, served as an intermediary in the transaction. The tower now houses the Mexican headquarters of Axa, a multinational insurance company based in Paris, France.

Description 
The Tower has a height of 132 meters (433 ft) and 30-32 floors, plus 5 floors of parking underground, with 29 upper floors of windows, and 2 enclosed top floors. The building has been nicknamed "La Licuadora" ("The blender") because of its shape resembling a food blender.

History 

The construction of the Tower began in 1981 and ended in 1984, by Grupo Mexicano de Desarrollo. Its architect was Pedro Ramirez Vázquez. After the 1985 Mexico earthquake, it was considered one of the safest skyscrapers in the Mexican capital  along with Torre Mayor, Torre Ejecutiva Pemex, Mexico World Trade Center, Torre Latinoamericana, HSBC Tower, Edificio Reforma Avantel, St. Regis Hotel & Residences, and Torre Insignia. It can withstand an earthquake of 8.5 on the Richter scale.

Structural details 
It has survived five earthquakes: that of 1985, which measured 8.1 on the Richter scale; that of 1995, 7.7 on the Richter scale; that of 2003, 7.6 on the Richter scale; and that of April 13, 2007, measured 6.3 on the Richter scale; and the 2017 Central México Earthquake of September 19, 2017. It is thus among a group of present-day Mexico City skyscrapers to have gone through all five earthquakes of recent decades, together with Torre Insignia, the Presidente InterContinental Hotel, Torre Ejecutiva Pemex, World Trade Center México, and Torre de Tlatelolco. The primary material used in construction was reinforced concrete.

See also 
 List of tallest buildings in Mexico City

References

External links

 Torre Mexicana de Aviación - Emporis
 Skyscraperpage (Torre Mexicana)

Axa Mexico
Benito Juárez, Mexico City
Axa
Mexicana de Aviación
1982 establishments in Mexico
Office buildings completed in 1982
1980s in Mexico City
20th-century architecture in Mexico